The 1961 Texas Western Miners football team was an American football team that represented Texas Western College (now known as University of Texas at El Paso) as a member of the Border Conference during the 1961 NCAA University Division football season. In its fifth and final season under head coach Ben Collins, the team compiled a 3–7 record (1–3 against Border Conference opponents), finished fourth in the conference, and was outscored by a total of 283 to 176.

Schedule

References

Texas Western
UTEP Miners football seasons
Texas Western Miners football